The N-135 is a highway in Spain. 

It starts north of Pamplona with a junction on N-121 and Autovía A-15.

The N-135 heads north up the valley of Rio Arga and the Puerto Ibañeta (1,057m) near Roncesvalles.

National roads in Spain
Transport in Navarre